Gamabong (가마봉 / 可馬峰) is a mountain of South Korea. It has an elevation of 1,191 metres.

See also
List of mountains of Korea

References

Mountains of South Korea
One-thousanders of South Korea